Irkutsk Oblast is a federal subject of Russia (an oblast), located in southeastern Siberia in the basins of the Angara, Lena, and Nizhnyaya Tunguska Rivers. The administrative center is the city of Irkutsk. It borders the Republic of Buryatia and the Tuva Republic in the south and southwest, which separate it from Khövsgöl Province in Mongolia; Krasnoyarsk Krai in the west; the Sakha Republic in the northeast; and Zabaykalsky Krai in the east. It had a population of 2,428,750 at the 2010 Census.

Geography

Irkutsk Oblast borders with the Republic of Buryatia and the Tuva Republic in the south and southwest, with Krasnoyarsk Krai in the west, with the Sakha Republic in the northeast, and with Zabaykalsky Krai in the east.

The unique and world-famous Lake Baikal is located in the southeast of the region.  It is drained by the Angara, which flows north across the province; the outflow rate is controlled by the Irkutsk Dam. The two other major dams on the Irkutsk Oblast's section of the Angara are at Bratsk and Ust-Ilimsk; both forming large reservoirs. The Lena has its source in Irkutsk Oblast as well, and flows north-east into the neighboring Sakha Republic.

Irkutsk Oblast consists mostly of the hills and broad valleys of the Central Siberian Plateau, with the Lena-Angara Plateau. The Primorsky Range and the Baikal Mountains stretch along Lake Baikal, and in the northeast rise the North Baikal Highlands and the Patom Plateau.

Climate
The climate varies from warm summer continental in the south to continental-subarctic in the northern part (Köppen climate classification: Dwc). For almost half the year, from mid-October until the beginning of April, the average temperature is below . January is the driest month, with only  of precipitation. Annual precipitation averages .

History

Pre-history
Mongolic-related Slab Grave cultural monuments survive in Baikal territory. The territory of Buryatia came under the control of the Xiongnu Empire (209 BC – 93 CE), of the Mongolian Xianbei state (93–234), of the Rouran Khaganate (330–555), of the Göktürk Khaganate (555-603), of the Eastern Turkic Khaganate (603-744), of the Uyghur Khaganate (744-847), of the Yenisei Kyrgyz (847-1219), of the Mongol Empire (1206–1368) and of the Northern Yuan (1368–1691). 
Medieval Mongol tribes like the Merkit, Bayads, Barga Mongols and Tümeds inhabited Buryatia. Today Buryat-Mongols remain in the territory of the oblast.

Russian presence in the area dates from the 17th century: the Russian Tsardom expanded eastward following the conquest of the Khanate of Sibir in 1582. By the end of the 17th century, Irkutsk had become a small town, monasteries were being built, and suburbs and agricultural settlements had started to form.

18th century
From the 18th century trades and crafts began to develop, and gold- and silver-smiths appeared. As the Russian state expanded to the east of Irkutsk, the city became the capital of enormous territories from the Yenisey River to the Pacific Ocean, and played an important role in the exploration and securing of vast Eastern-Siberian and Far-Eastern territories for Russia. Gradually, Irkutsk gained more importance as the main transportation- and trade-center of Eastern Siberia; it became a center of trade routes from Kamchatka, Chukotka, Yakutia to Mongolia, and China. The administrative importance of the city also increased, and it became a center of a fifth of the provinces of Siberia; in 1764 it became the center of an independent province, the Irkutsk Governorate.

For Irkutsk the 18th century was a time of research expeditions. Some of the organization of Vitus Bering's first (1725–1730) and second (1733-1743) expeditions to the shores of Kamchatka took place in Irkutsk.

A merchant class developed in the city of Irkutsk. In the second half of the eighteenth century, the Irkutsk industrial and merchant companies of Golikov, Trapeznikov,  began to explore the Aleutian Islands and later Alaska. In 1799 the merchant companies came together in a Russian-American Company "for the trades on the territory of the Aleutian and Kuril islands and the rest of the North-Eastern sea, belonging to Russia by the right of discovery". Grigorii Ivanovich Shelikhov, an outstanding seafarer, played an important role in controlling enormous spaces of the northern part of the Pacific Ocean. He founded the first colonies of Russian America through the Shelikhov-Golikov Company. In 1727 the Russian Orthodox Church established the Irkutsk Eparchy.

During the 18th century, schools, professional-technical education colleges, science museums, libraries, theaters, and book-printers developed in Irkutsk. Educational and cultural organizations opened. The 1780s saw the opening of the second public library in provincial towns in Russia, as well as a regional museum and an amateur theater. In Irkutsk outstanding citizens appeared, still remembered today. These included the architect, geographer and historian  (1765–1829), the writer  (1797–1863), and the teacher Semyon Semyonovich Schukin (1789—1863). Siberian science buildings opened. A.G. Laxman, Lomonosov's apprentice, one of the first Siberian mineralogists, worked in Irkutsk.

The city landscape of Irkutsk was changing. The  of 1706 (one of the oldest stone buildings in Eastern Siberia), the unique  (1747), the "Prikaznaya izba" (order house), the first stone construction, and the Triumph gate were built.

19th century

In the late eighteenth century and the early nineteenth century, Irkutsk Province gradually increased in importance as a center of trade, craft, and culture. It became the center of Russian trade with China and, from the 1830s, a gold-manufacturing center of Eastern Siberia. In 1803 Irkutsk became the center of the Siberian Governorate-General, and in 1822 it became the center of the Eastern Siberian Governorate-General. The Governors-General of Eastern Siberia greatly influenced the development of the city.

Irkutsk merchants explored the Yeniseysky and Leno-Vitimsky gold regions and substantially increased their capital, which made them the richest merchants in Siberia. The Irkutsk merchant class began to play a major role in the city's development. Intensive city construction took place. Private residences, hospitals, orphanages, and schools were built, while significant funds went towards education and the development of science in the region.

The architecture of the city of Irkutsk underwent change. The , done in Russian classic style in 1800–1804, and the  – a monument of the nineteenth century, were built in honor of the tenth anniversary of Alexander I's reign.

In the second half of the nineteenth century the printing art developed in Irkutsk, the first newspapers being, “Irkutsk province news” and “Amur”. The names of A.P.Schapov, M.B.Zagoskin, V.I.Vagin were connected with the newspaper “Siberia”. In 1851, the first scientific organization in Eastern Siberia – the Siberian branch of Russian geographical society, was opened. In 1877, it was called the Eastern-Siberian branch. V.I.Dybovskii, A.L.Chekanovskii, I.D.Cherskii, V.A.Obruchev, geologists, geographers and researchers of Siberia, worked in Irkutsk Oblast on exploring Lake Baikal and the Lena River.

The summer of 1879 could be considered to be a dramatic period in the city of Irkutsk's history. During a July 22–24 fire almost all the central parts of the city were burnt, and more than two thirds of city buildings and 75 city districts were destroyed. The city began to revive, getting a new look. Stone and wooden constructions built after the fire have been preserved up to the present day. In 1898 the arrival of the first train via the Trans-Siberian Railway to Irkutsk Oblast was a major event. The construction of the Trans-Siberian Railway contributed to further city development.

Several politically exiled figures were connected with Irkutsk city. Among the first of the exiled was A.N. Radischev, who lived in Irkutsk for more than 3 months. Since the 1830s, the Decembrists lived in settlements and in colonies in the Irkutsk Oblast. The exiled houses of Volkonsky and Trubetskoy later became house-museums. N. A. Panov, I. V. Podzhio, A. Z. Muravyov, P. A. Mukhanov, A. P. Yushnevsky, V. A. Bechasnov, the wife of Trubetskoy and their children stayed in Irkutsk for the rest of their lives. In the late 1850s, the Petrashevtzy appeared in Irkutsk. The exiled historian-democrat, A.P. Schapov, lived here until his last days, and the Polish rebels and revolutionaries (including the narodnik) also lived here.

A well-known Russian publicist of the nineteenth century, N. Shelgunov, wrote about Irkutsk: “Irkutsk is the only Siberian city, which has the city character. ...As England created London, France - Paris, Siberia – created Irkutsk. Siberia is proud of Irkutsk, “not to see this city” means “not to see Siberia”.

In the early nineteenth century the city was considerably changed, especially its center. Large buildings were being built, mason streets were being made, cab drivers and street lights appeared. The water supply and the first electrification stations were built. The Irkutsk Regional museum was stamped with the names of Siberian researchers on its walls (1883), the building of the first public community, city theater (1897), Kazan' cathedral, made in new Byzantine style (1893), and the Roman Catholic cathedral (1895) completed an architectural style of the city. In 1908 a monument to Alexander III was opened on the Angara embankment.

20th century

The city was damaged and influenced by the political events of the twentieth century – the Russian revolution, the 1917 October Revolution, the Civil war and the Great Patriotic War (as the Soviet Union's part in WW2 is commonly referred to in Russia. This is distinct from WW2, in that it began with 1941 Operation Barbarossa, whereas WW2 began with the September 1939 invasion of Poland).

Since the 1930s the industrial construction of the city had begun. Mechanical engineering plants, the air plant, brick and concrete plants, tea fabric, and food industry plants were being built. Economic development of the city contributed to scientific, educational and cultural development. The first Higher education in Eastern Siberia, Irkutsk State University was founded in 1918. Its departments were developing as independent institutes: medical, pedagogical, finance-economical. In 1930 the metallurgic institute was opened, in 1934 the agricultural institute was organized.

The early Soviets educated women in traditional professions like nursing and primary education. At right is the Irkutsk orphanage named for E. Medvednikova, which served both as an eleemosynary institution and educational facility.

Since the 1950s a rapid development of the city of Irkutsk took place. In 1947 streetcar routes were opened in the city and trolleybus routes were opened in 1972. In 1958 a TV center was established. The city's larger districts and micro regions construction period began. New districts such as Baykalsky, Solnechny, Yubileyny, Primorsky, Akademgorodok and others were created.

21st century

The 2022 Russian invasion of Ukraine negatively affected the Irkutskian conscript class of February 2023 who all perished near Donetsk by early March 2023. Irkutsk regional governor Igor Kobzev, a general and a former deputy head of the Ministry of Emergency Situations who has four children himself, had said the previous November that the sons of Irkutsk belonged to the state rather than to their families.

Administrative divisions

Economy

The main industries of Irkutsk Oblast are metals, energy, logging, oil and fuels, machine-building, chemicals, food industry, and hydroelectricity. The average wages in Irkutsk Oblast are 10% higher than in Russia overall.

Politics

Soviet era
During the Soviet period, the high authority in the oblast was shared between three persons: The first secretary of the Irkutsk CPSU Committee (who in reality had the biggest authority), the chairman of the oblast Soviet (legislative power), and the Chairman of the oblast Executive Committee (executive power). After the abolition of Article 6 of the Constitution of the USSR in March 1990, the CPSU lost its monopoly on power. The head of the Oblast administration, and eventually the governor was appointed/elected alongside elected regional parliament.

Russian Federation
The Charter of Irkutsk Oblast is the fundamental law of the region. The Legislative Assembly of Irkutsk Oblast is the province's standing legislative (representative) body. The Legislative Assembly exercises its authority by passing laws, resolutions, and other legal acts and by supervising the implementation and observance of the laws and other legal acts passed by it. The highest executive body is the Oblast Government, which includes territorial executive bodies such as district administrations, committees, and commissions that facilitate development and run the day to day matters of the province. The Oblast administration supports the activities of the Governor who is the highest official and acts as guarantor of the observance of the oblast Charter in accordance with the Constitution of Russia.

Demographics

The oblast is very thinly populated, with a population density of 3 people per square kilometer, compared to a national average of 8.4. Irkutsk is the administrative center and largest city, with 612,973 residents. Other large cities are Bratsk (238,825 people), Angarsk (229,592 people), Ust-Ilimsk (83,635 people), and Usolye-Sibirskoye (80,331 people).

Most of the population are ethnic Russians. A minority group, the Buryats, have a special Ust-Orda Buryat Okrug inside the oblast. Russians and other Slavic/Germanic groups make up 92.9% of the population, according to the 2021 Census, while Buryats are 3.6%. Tofalars number 659, a decrease from 722 in 1989.

One small ethnic group, concentrated in three villages (Pikhtinsk, Sredne-Pikhtinsk, and Dagnik) in Zalarinsky District is the so-called "Bug Hollanders": descendants of Polish-speaking Lutheran farmers who had moved to Siberia from the then Russian Volhynia in 1911–1912 in search of affordable land.  Although they had long lost German (or Dutch) language of their ancestors (even in the early twentieth century they spoke Ukrainian and read Polish), they were still considered ethnic Germans, and during World War II were usually drafted for work in labor camps, instead of front-line military service.

Religion

According to a 2012 survey 28.1% of the population of Irkutsk Oblast adheres to the Russian Orthodox Church, 7% are unaffiliated generic Christians, 6% are Orthodox Christian believers without belonging to any church or are members of other (non-Russian) Orthodox churches, 2% of the population adheres to the Slavic native faith (Rodnovery), and 1% to Islam. In addition, 37% of the population declares to be "spiritual but not religious", 17% is atheist, and 1.9% follows other religions or did not give an answer to the question.

Population 

Irkutsk Oblast registered natural population growth in 2008, the first time after 1993. Still, the future prospects for population growth in Irkutsk seems bleak. In 2007, women in Irkutsk were having an average of 1.602 children each. Fertility rate was extremely low in urban areas, where women were having just 1.477 children each. In rural areas however, the fertility rate was slightly above replaceable levels. In rural areas of Irkutsk Oblast, women were having an average of 2.165 children each. (Figures are not available for 2008, although for Russia as a whole fertility rates for 2008 were approx. 6% higher than that in 2007, and for Irkutsk 9% higher).

Vital statistics for 2012
Births: 38 516 (15.9 per 1000)
Deaths: 33 495 (13.8 per 1000) 
Total fertility rate:
2009: 1.88 | 2010: 1.82 | 2011: 1.86 | 2012: 1.97 | 2013: 1.98 | 2014: 1.97 | 2015: 2.01 | 2016: 1.98(e)

Vital statistics
Population: 2,424,456 (2012)
Urban Pop: 1,929,263 (2012)
Rural Pop: 495,193 (2012)
Births: 36,935(2010)
Birth rate: 15.2 (2010)
Urban Birth Rate: 14.2 (2010)
Rural Birth Rate: 19.1 (2010)
Deaths: 35,105 (2010)
Death rate: 14.4 (2010)
Urban Death Rate: 14.1 (2010)
Rural Death Rate: 15.7 (2010)
TFR: 1.768 children per women. (2009)
Urban TFR: 1.611 children per women. (2009)
Rural TFR: 2.421 children per women. (2009) 
Natural Growth Rate: +0.11% per year (+0.01% in Urban areas & +0.34% in Rural areas).

See also

Music of Irkutsk
List of Chairmen of the Legislative Assembly of Irkutsk Oblast

References

Citations

Sources

Further reading
Brumfield, William. Irkutsk: Architectural Heritage in Photographs  (Moscow: Tri Kvadrata Publishing, 2006)

External links

Official website of Irkutsk Oblast  
Kommersant.com. Information about Irkutsk Oblast.

 

 
States and territories established in 1937
Oblasts of the Russian Soviet Federative Socialist Republic
Oblasts of Russia